The 1913 Army Cadets football team represented the United States Military Academy in the 1913 college football season. In their first season under head coach Charles Dudley Daly, the Cadets compiled an 8–1 record, shut out five of their nine opponents, and outscored all opponents by a combined total of 253 to 57 – an average of 28.1 points scored and 6.3 points allowed.  The Cadets' only loss was against Notre Dame by a 35 to 13 score.  In the annual Army–Navy Game at the Polo Grounds in New York City, the Cadets  
 
End Louis A. Merrilat was a consensus first-team player on the All-America team. Tackle Alex Weyand was selected as a second-team All-American by Walter Camp and was later inducted into the College Football Hall of Fame.  Quarterback Vernon Prichard was selected as a second-team All-American by Harper's Weekly.

Schedule

References

Army
Army Black Knights football seasons
Army Cadets football